Augusto Introzzi (8 June 1912 – 17 August 1954) was an Italian racing cyclist. He rode in the 1937 Tour de France.

References

External links
 

1912 births
1954 deaths
Italian male cyclists
Place of birth missing
Cyclists from the Province of Como
Tour de Suisse stage winners